Jo Maso (born 27 December 1944) is a French former rugby league and rugby union footballer who played in the 1960s, 1970s and 1980s. He played centre and fly-half for the France national rugby union team, gaining 25 caps. He was inducted into the International Rugby Hall of Fame in 2003. He is now the manager for the France national team.

Maso was born in Toulouse, France. Maso started his rugby career as a professional rugby league footballer for XIII Catalan, being the son of the French rugby league internationalist Jep Maso. However, he switched to union. He played club rugby for Narbonne, Toulonnais and Perpignan. He debuted for France against Italy in Naples in 1966. He also toured Australia, New Zealand and South Africa with the national side, and played three times for the Barbarians.

References

External links

1944 births
Living people
Sportspeople from Perpignan
French rugby union players
Barbarian F.C. players
Rugby union centres
World Rugby Hall of Fame inductees
French rugby league players
France international rugby union players
XIII Catalan players